French Resistance museums and memorials commemorate people and events associated with the French movements, collectively known as the French Resistance that fought against the Nazi German occupation of France and the collaborationist Vichy régime during the Second World War.

The following is a list of this type of museums and memorials:

List of museums and memorials

 Musée départemental de Résistance et Déportation (Agen)
 Musée de la Résistance et de la Déportation (Charente) (Angoulême)
 Musée de la Résistance d'Anterrieux (Anterrieux)
 Centre de la résistance et de la déportation du Pays d'Arles (Arles)
 The Museum of the Resistance and Deportation (Besançon)
 Musée de la Résistance, de la Déportation et de la Libération du Loir-et-Cher (Blois)
 Musée de la Résistance de Bondues au Fort Lobau (Nord) (Bondues)
 Centre Jean Moulin (Bordeaux)
 Musée de la Résistance et de la Déportation de Bourges et du Cher (Bourges)
 Centre National d'Etudes de la Résistance et de la Déportation Edmond Michelet (Brive-la-Gaillarde)
 Mémorial de Caen (Caen)
 Musée de la Résistance (Castellane)
 Centre régional de la Résistance et de la Déportation de Castelnau-le-Lez (Hérault) (Castelnau-le-Lez)
 Musée du souvenir de Châlons (Marne) (Châlons-en-Champagne)
 Musée de la Résistance, de l'Internement et de la Déportation de Chamalières (Chamalières)
 (Champigny-sur-Marne)
 Musée de la Résistance de Châteaubriant-Voves-Rouillé (Châteaubriant)
 Mémorial du Vercors (Vassieux-en-Vercors)
 Mémorial Charles de Gaulle (Colombey-les-Deux-Églises)
 Mémorial de l'internement et de la déportation (Compiègne)
 Musée de la Résistance et de la Déportation (Fargniers)
 Musée Départemental de la Résistance et de la Déportation de Forges-les-Eaux (Forges-les-Eaux)
 Musée de la Résistance, de la Déportation et de la Seconde Guerre mondiale (Frugières-le-Pin)
 Musée de la Résistance et de la Déportation de l'Isère (Grenoble)
 Maison d'Izieu mémorial des enfants juifs exterminés (Izieu)
 Lieu de Mémoire au Chambon-sur-Lignon (Le Chambon-sur-Lignon, Haute-Loire)
 Musée départemental de la Résistance et de la Déportation (Loiret) (Lorris)
 Centre d'histoire de la résistance et de la déportation (Lyon)
 Musée de la Résistance et de la Déportation (Tarn-et-Garonne) (Montauban)
 Musée Bourbonnais de la Résistance Nationale (Allier) (Montluçon)
 Musée de l'Histoire vivante (Montreuil)
 Musée de la Résistance et de la Déportation (Nantua)
 Musée de la Résistance Henri Queuille (Corrèze) (Neuvic)
 Centre de recherche et d'étude azuréen du Musée de la Résistance Nationale (Nice)
 Centre de la mémoire d'Oradour-sur-Glane, village martyr (Oradour-sur-Glane)
 Mémorial du Maréchal Leclerc de Hauteclocque et de la Libération de Paris et Musée Jean Moulin (Paris)
 Musée de la Résistance (Peyrat-le-Château)
 Musée de la reddition de Reims (Reims)
 Musée pyrénéen de la Résistance et de la Libération, dans l'Ariège (Rimont)
 Centre Historique de la Résistance en Drôme et de la Déportation de Romans (Romans-sur-Isère)
 Musée de la Résistance en Morvan (Saint-Brisson)
 Mémorial de la Résistance et de la Déportation de la Loire (Saint-Étienne)
 Musée de la Résistance bretonne (Saint-Marcel)
 Le Centre européen du Résistant déporté au Struthof (Natzwiller)
 Musée de la Résistance et de la Déportation (Tarbes)
 Musée de la Résistance et de la Déportation de Picardie (Tergnier)
 Musée Départemental de la Résistance (Thônes (La Balme-de-Thuy))
 Centre Régional Résistance et Liberté (Deux-Sèvres) (Thouars)
 Musée départemental de la Résistance et de la Déportation (Toulouse)
 Musée vauzélien de la Résistance Nationale (Nièvre) (Varennes-Vauzelles)
 Musée départemental de la déportation et de l'internement (Varilhes)
 Mémorial de la Résistance (Vassieux-en-Vercors)
 Musée de la Résistance (Rosine Perrier) (Villargondran)

See also
 List of Holocaust memorials and museums in France

References

External links
 Résistance: Histoires de familles, Musée et lieux de mémoire (Museums and Memorial Places) (in French)

French Resistance
French Resistance
French Resistance
French Resistance